Metarctia fontainei is a moth of the subfamily Arctiinae. It was described by Sergius G. Kiriakoff in 1953. It is found in the Democratic Republic of the Congo.

References

 

Metarctia
Moths described in 1953